The Adventures of Jinbao  ( (Released as The Adventures of Panda Warrior in the US) is a 2012 Chinese-Hong Kong computer-animated action comedy martial arts film directed by Kwok-Shing Lo and written by Andy Ng Yiu-Kuen and Lam Fung. The film's English cast features Rob Schneider (in a dual role), Haylie Duff, Norm Macdonald, Lauren Elizabeth, and Tom Kenny (in a triple role). Many of the film's fight scenes were animated using motion capture.

Plot
In Imperial China, a peace-loving soldier named Jinbao has heard about Merryland from his grandfather who gave him a necklace he got. His Captain states that the world won't be at peace. During an attack on their camp, Jinbao runs off the cliff and finds himself in Merryland in the form of the giant panda. When falling out the sky, he is saved by Flying Pig. Jinbao learns about Merryland and how it is ruled by an evil master and his Phantom Army as well as the prophecy of the Panda Warrior.

While traveling through the forest, they are attacked by a giant spider. Then they spar with Mantis who becomes their ally. Arriving at a village of onion creatures, they find it attacked by the Phantom Army which is led by a pyrokinetic tree spirit named Charcoal. With help from Flying Pig claiming that Charcoal insulted his grandfather, Jinbao subdues Charcoal in the nearby water. A Ginseng Spirit arrives and plays the Song of Peace to purify it. Jinbao learns from the Ginseng Spirit that he must rest in order to have the energy to do the Song of Peace. Now purified, Charcoal joins up with Jinbao.

Traveling through the field, Jinbao, Flying Pig, Mantis, and Charcoal are attacked by the Phantom Army's general Cattle. They are joined by Flying Pig's fellow rebels Cotton Sheep Sister, Steel Mouth Chicken, Horse, Big-Eyed Monkey, Golden Retriever, and Big-Eared Rabbit. Despite the difficulty, the group manages to knock Cattle off a cliff. Jinbao gets to know each of the members where he did annoy Horse by stating that he looks more like a hippopotamus than a horse.

The group arrives at the headquarters of the rebellion where they meet with Lion King. When he sees Jinbao, Lion King states that Jinbao is not the Panda Warrior of Legend. The history is that Merryland is guarded by the heavenly sperm whales Hope and Faith. When Hope absorbed too much of the Dragon Ball of Light, a warrior from Earth appeared and became the Panda Warrior. Jinbao figures out that the Panda Warrior is his grandfather. When his grandfather defeated Hope and returned to his world with the necklace from Merryland's ruler Princess Angelica, an evil rat from another world arrived in Merryland where he took control of Hope's body and turned it into a Nine-Headed Snake in order to enslave Merryland. Jinbao asks for Lion King to train him. Despite many painful and comical outcomes, Jinbao passes the training.

Jinbao and Charcoal pay a visit to the Fox Elder in order to find the Nine-Headed Snake's lair where he is keeping Princess Angelica captive. After getting a stone that came off the lair and a piece of paper to use for emergencies, Jinbao and Charcoal find Cotton Sheep Sister who states that the other rebels have been captured by the Phantom Army. Once they have found the Nine-Headed Snake's lair, the three of them are attacked by a corrupted Flying Pig who they knocked out. Traveling through the caves, Jinbao, Charcoal, and Cotton Sheep Sister are attacked by the corrupted rebels and brought to Cattle. It is then revealed that the rebels faked being corrupted as they attack Cattle. Once Cattle is restrained, the Ginseng Spirit arrives and plays his Song of Peace to purify Cattle. Now purified, Cattle joins up with the rebels to rescue Princess Angelica.

As the group gets further into the Nine-Headed Snake's lair, they are attacked by the Nine-Headed Snake. Each of them tries to attack the Nine-Headed Snake only to fail because his heads can regenerate. Charcoal sacrifices himself to buy everyone else time to get to Princess Angelica. Big-Eyed Monkey reads from the partially-burned paper that one must be sacrificed to save everyone. They find her chained over the water that is filled with evil poison that is slowly corrupting the Dragon Ball of Light. Cattle starts to make up for his mistake by traversing the poison water to rescue Princess Angelica as he is the only one who can break the chains. Cattle collapses as Jinbao hopes that he'll recover. When the Nine-Headed Snake starts to catch up to them, Mantis appears and has dug a hole for everyone to escape through. Cattle buys everyone time to get out. The Nine-Headed Snake starts to tunnel after them as his flying lair collapses.

When morning comes, Steel Mouth Chicken crows at the sight of the sun. As Jinbao faces the Nine-Headed Snake, a recovering Princess Angelica states that the Nine-Headed Snake is at his weakest during the day. The rebels join the fight against the Nine-Headed Snake. The Ginseng Spirit shows up and plays his Song of Peace to weaken the Nine-Headed Snake. Faith shows up to help as she restores the land, purifies the Phantom Army, and even revives Cattle and Charcoal. The rebels then do a combo attack against its heads in order to defeat it while getting entangled. Cotton Sheep Sister attacks the Wind Head, Horse attacks the Water Head, Mantis attacks the Ice Head, Big-Eared Rabbit attacks the Fire Head, Big-Eyed Monkey attacks the Electric Head, Flying Pig attacks the Poison Head, Golden Retriever attacks the Spear Head, Steel Mouth Chicken attacks the Bewitching Head, and Jinbao attacks the main head. The final blow breaks the Nine-Headed Snake as the evil rat emerges and flees Merryland.

What's left of the Nine-Headed Snake is restored to Hope as she rejoins Faith in the sky. Princess Angelica gives them the Dragon Ball of Light as she states that Hope and Faith will continue to guard Merryland. Everyone celebrates their victory.

During the credits, Jinbao is back on Earth as he spars with his Captain using the moves that he learned in Merryland as well as drinking Chinese alcohol. Their sparring ends in a draw.

Cast
 Lam Chi-chung as Jinbao, a soldier who is turned into a giant panda upon being transported to Merryland
 Wang Mijia as Flying Pig, a big-eared pig and member of the resistance who can fly.
 Ji Tao as Lion King, a wise lion who trains Jinbao to fight.
 Ke Siming as Sister Sheep, a sheep member of the resistance who is into beauty.
 Zheng Yang as Charcoal Puppet Vanguard, a tree spirit and self-proclaimed Phantom Warrior who can perform fire attacks that allies with Jinbao and the resistance after being purified.
 Hao Yu Lan as Ginseng Spirit, the spirit of a ginseng who allies with Jinbao and the resistance.
 Jun Hu as Mantis, a mantis member of the resistance.
 Jun He also voices Iron-Billed Chicken, a chicken member of the resistance whose pecks can break through rocks.
 Jun He also voices Nine-Headed Snake, a tyrannical giant King cobra with eight additional snake heads that shoot wind, water, ice, fire, electricity, poison, spears, and magic.
 Xiang He as Bull, a tough-skinned cattle with super-strength who allies with Jinbao and the resistance after being purified.
 Xiang He also voices Horse, a hippopotamus member of the resistance who prefers to be called a "river horse."
 Jack Tu as Big-Eyed Monkey, a monkey in glasses who is the resistance's inventor.
 Jerry Liau as Golden Retriever, a Golden Retriever member of the resistance.
 Jiao Jiao as Big-Eared Rabbit, a rabbit member of the resistance.
 Jiao Jiao also voices the White Dragon Princess who is held captive by the Nine-Headed Snake.

English dub
 Rob Schneider as Patrick, Jimmy Ginseng
 Haylie Duff as GoGo Goat
 Norm Macdonald as King Leo
 Lauren Elizabeth as Peggy Skyflyer
 Tom Kenny as Bernie Hothead, Manny Mantis, Spinny the Monkey
 Jamieson Price as Crusher the Ox
 Michael Sorich as Shadowfeet the River Horse
 Spike Spencer as Billy Beakman
 Tom Fahn as Bruce Barkley
 Wendee Lee as Bobby Bunny, Princess Angelica, Fox Elder
 Michael McConnohie as Captain
 Derek Stephen Prince as Nine-Headed Snake

Amanda Celine Miller, Tony Oliver, and Ben Pronsky provide additional voices in the film.

Jackie Chan voiced Jinbao in the Mandarin version.

Crew

English dub
 Wendee Lee - Voice Director
 Tony Oliver - Voice Director

Release
The film was released in China on August 10, 2012, in both 2D and 3D.

The film was brought over to the US for an English language release in 2016, the English dub for the film was produced at Bang Zoom! Entertainment in California and features a few celebrity voices such as Rob Schneider, Haylie Duff, and Norm MacDonald. The English dub was released on DVD by Lionsgate Home Entertainment on August 2, 2016.

There were a few changes done to the film for its American release, such as Jinbao's name being changed to Patrick. A song exclusive to the film's English dub called Miracle was included in the end credits, this same song was previously used in the American release of The Giant King and was later used again in the American release for Air Bound.

Reception
The film received very negative reviews from critics and audiences. Many of the reviews criticized the movie for being a blatant ripoff of Kung Fu Panda.

References

External links
 
 
 The Adventures of Panda Warrior on Behind the Voice Actors

2012 films
2010s English-language films
2010s Cantonese-language films
Hong Kong animated films
2012 computer-animated films
2012 animated films
Chinese martial arts comedy films
2010s martial arts comedy films
Animated films about animals
Films about giant pandas
Films set in Imperial China
2012 martial arts films
2012 multilingual films
Chinese multilingual films
2010s Hong Kong films